This is the list of cities which have premetro systems – i.e. tram or light rail systems which are, or were, intended to be converted to full rapid transit systems.

List

List of former premetros

See also 
 Premetro
 Tram and light rail transit systems
 List of tram and light rail transit systems
 List of town tramway systems (all-time list)
 Medium-capacity rail transport system
 List of metro systems
 List of suburban and commuter rail systems
 List of trolleybus systems

References

Light rail
Tram transport
Rapid transit